Alma Rosa Martínez (born 22 August 1951) is a Mexican sprinter. She competed in the women's 4 × 100 metres relay at the 1968 Summer Olympics.

References

1951 births
Living people
Athletes (track and field) at the 1968 Summer Olympics
Mexican female sprinters
Olympic athletes of Mexico
Place of birth missing (living people)
Olympic female sprinters